The peanut butter and banana sandwich (PB&B), or peanut butter, banana and bacon sandwich (PB,B&B), sometimes referred to as an Elvis sandwich or simply the Elvis, is a sandwich with toasted bread, peanut butter, sliced or mashed banana, and occasionally bacon. Honey or jelly is seen in some variations of the sandwich. The sandwich is frequently cooked in a pan or on a griddle. 

The sandwich was made famous as a favorite of the American singer Elvis Presley. The recipe for the sandwich has been published in numerous cookbooks and newspaper stories. It has been sold commercially in restaurants.

Elvis Presley
The peanut butter and banana sandwich has been referred to as a favorite of Elvis Presley, who was renowned for his food cravings such as the Fool's Gold Loaf, a loaf of French white bread filled with a pound each of bacon, peanut butter, and grape jelly. Books on Presley's favorite foods and culinary tastes, as well as other published reports on his taste for peanut butter and banana sandwiches with or without bacon, have made the sandwich widely associated with Presley. It is often referred to using his name.

Presley's fondness for peanut butter and banana sandwiches is well established; however, bacon is not mentioned in all accounts. A book about Presley and his mother, Gladys Presley, though, says he had "sandwich after sandwich of his favorite—peanut butter, sliced bananas, and crisp bacon". Another passage describes him talking "feverishly until dawn" while "wolfing" down the sandwiches (described in this instance as being made with mashed banana).

A news report suggests that, based on renditions of sandwiches named after him, Presley ate his with caramelized bananas and crispy bacon on grilled Hawaiian bread, and grilled by his mother or his cook in bacon fat. The Good, the Bad, and the Yummy describes it as consisting of half a banana and a piece of bacon per sandwich, browning the sandwiches in a frying pan with butter, cutting the sandwiches into wedges, and piling them high.

Variants
The PB&B sandwich has had numerous variations, many of which were billed as "Elvis Presley's" or owing to "Elvis" himself. Hamburgers done Elvis style have become increasingly popular in the United States as well. Nigella Lawson of the cooking show Nigella Bites featured "Elvis Presley's Fried Peanut Butter and Banana Sandwich" in a 2007 episode that was made of white bread, butter, a banana, and peanut butter.

Another cooking show Sara's Secrets featured the "Elvis" with the Peanut Butter & Co.'s recipe, which includes 8 slices of bread, butter, a banana, peanut butter, 12 slices of bacon and honey.

A variant on the sandwich is the peanut butter banana club sandwich, which combines the sandwich with a club sandwich by adding lettuce, brown sugar and lemon juice. Another version of the sandwich, which added honey and substituted bacon bits for bacon strips, was sold under the name The Memphis at the now-shuttered "all peanut butter sandwich" restaurant P.B. Loco.

The sandwich has also been featured in a cookbook for canines in The Everything Cooking for Dogs Book. The book suggests alternative fillings including sweet potato, carrots, pumpkin, and apples.

See also

 List of sandwiches
 List of peanut dishes

References

External links
Recipe from Food Network

Elvis Presley
American sandwiches
Bacon sandwiches
Banana dishes
Peanut butter sandwiches